The New Legend of Shaolin (released in the United Kingdom as Legend of the Red Dragon and in the Philippines as Once Upon a Time in China-4) is a 1994 Hong Kong martial arts film directed by Wong Jing and Corey Yuen, and produced by Jet Li, who also stars in the lead role. The film showcases Hung Hei-kwun's exploits as a rebel against the Qing government, and it is one of two films in which Li and Miu Tse play a father-son duo, the other being My Father Is a Hero. The film was released in Hong Kong on 3 March 1994. The film also pays homage to the Japanese film Lone Wolf and Cub: Sword of Vengeance, with the opening scene being a parody of said film, while also having a similar plot of a father going on a journey of revenge with his infant son.

Plot
Hung Hei-kwun arrives in his village after a raid by government soldiers, only to find his whole village destroyed. Hung Hei-kwun quickly finds his infant son and gives him a choice between death and joining him in the rebellion. Upon leaving his village he encounters Ma Ling-yee, who is also supposed to be involved in the rebellion; he learns that Ling-yee had betrayed him and their village for the bounty on Hei-kwun's head.  After an epic battle, the film skips ahead several years and arrives with Hung Hei-kwun and his now-skilled son making their way through China in order to find money for food.  At this time, the film introduces "Red Bean", who is in the process of swindling a very rich man, Ma Kai-sin, out of his money. Kwun tries to leave his son in the care of his brother but is betrayed, forcing him to kill his brother. The rich man, witnessing the carnage done by Kwun, hires Hung Hei-Kwun as a bodyguard. Initially he wants Kwun to help him bully and steal from others; Kwun refuses the offer but decides to be his bodyguard instead because he and Man Ting, his son, ran out of money.

At the same time the government has begun to crack down on Shaolin. Pieces of a map are tattooed onto the backs of several pupils, who are then removed from the temple in order to keep safe the Ming Dynasty treasure the map leads to. Years ago, Hung Hei-kwun's encounter with the money hungry Ma Ling-yee did not end as Hung thought it did: Ma Ling-yee survived the fight as a result of being dipped in poison and restored by The Monk of the West District. Now a disgusting creature, his only purpose for life is to get revenge and kill Hei-kwun. The government massacres Shaolin, while Ma Ling-yee himself kills the abbot. Thereafter, he begins the hunt for Hei-kwun and the escaped pupils.

Hei-kwun and Man-ting, along with Red Bean and her mother (who plays dead in order to swindle people out of their money) arrive at Ma Kai-sin's mansion. Red Bean is to be married to Kai-sin, who is completely oblivious to Red Bean and her mother's plans to steal his wealth. While Hei-kwun and Man-ting begin to settle in, Red Bean sees Hei-kwun as a threat to her plans. She attempts to kill him, but she fails and Hei-kwun warns her that as long as he is around, she will not be causing any trouble.  Man-ting sees all of this, and accuses his father of having feelings for Red Bean, since through their travels, Hei-kwun taught his son many teachings to stay alive, such as "to kill without mercy", or "hold your temper, but only until you cannot hold it anymore".

Meanwhile, Kai-sin's son, Ma Chiew-Heng, begins to bully Man-ting, due to Man-ting's low social status and Ma Chiew-Heng's jealousy of Man-ting's superiority in Kung Fu. Chiew-Heng, a former pupil of Shaolin (who has a part of the map tattooed on his back), calls upon his former Shaolin friends (who also have the other parts of the map) to help him beat up Man-ting. Man-ting, although trying to be passive at first, loses his temper, beating all the boys up, as well as spraining Chiew-Heng's arm. However, Man-ting commands Chiew-Heng to hold still as he quickly fixes his arm, to prevent permanent damage. This earns him the respect of all the other boys, and they all call him "oldest brother" out of respect, although he is the youngest of them all.

On the Lunar New Year, several guests dine and celebrate at Kai-yin's mansion. However, government soldiers have tracked the location of the pupils to Kai-Sin's home.  Ma Chiew-Heng escapes and causes confusion at the same time as Ling-yee is revealed, during which Man-ting is captured.  Ma Chiew-Heng reveals that his four brothers have been captured and that they have four pieces of the map tattooed on their backs and that he has the final piece tattooed on his back.  Hei-kwun fights Ling-yee.  Ma Chiew-Heng is captured.

Hei-kwun rescues the five boys and continues his fight with Ling-yee.  The five boys, now known as the dragon brothers, fight (unknown leader) who has chased them in a metal horse (self-powered cart).  Ting rejoins Hei-kwun and they blow up Ling-yee together.  Ling-yee unexpectedly survives.

Hei-kwun and the five boys travel to the Red Dragon Pavilion seeking a rumored Shaolin master.  They find a ghost town with an old man and a wax maker who make realistic wax figures using human flesh.  They get directions to the Red Dragon Pavilion and meet the rebels, led by Sung Young Chen, who has an invincible sword.  They are attacked by government forces.  Red Bean's mother rescues the boys from a dart attack, but is wounded in the process.  Hei-kwun kills (unknown leader).  Ling-yee attacks while they are mourning Red Bean's mother.  Hei-kwun fights Ling-yee while Red Bean and the five boys escape.  Man-ting rejoins Hei-kwun to help fight Ling-yee.  The secret shaolin master (secretly the old wax maker) rejoins them and fights Ling-yee using his dragon fists.  Red Bean and Hei-kwun rescue the boys from acid when Ling-yee breaks through the floor.  Ling-yee is killing Hei-kwun when Red Bean joins the fight.  Man-ting rescues her. Hei-kwun rescues Man-ting and tackles Ling-yee through a window to their mutual death, but is rescued by Man-ting who throws a rope.

They return to town.  Man-ting calls Red Bean mom as they ride off away from the sunset.

Cast
Jet Li as Hung Hei-kwun
Chen Sung-yung as Ma Kai-sin
Damian Lau as Chan Kan-nam
Ji Chunhua as Ma Ling-yee
Miu Tse as Hung Man-ting
Wang Lung-wei as Commander
Chingmy Yau as Red Bean
Deannie Yip as Red Bean's Mother
Wong Jing as Fong Sai-yuk (cameo)
Eric Tsang as Man in Crown (uncredited)

Release
The New Legend of Shaolin was released in Hong Kong on 3 March 1994. In the Philippines, the film was released as Once Upon a Time in China-4 by Solar Films on 22 September 1994.

Critical response
David Rooney of Variety called it "a high-kicking historical revenge spectacular" that is "a nonstop crowd-pleaser". Mick LaSalle of the San Francisco Chronicle wrote that film will appeal to hardcore fans, but the well-executed actions scenes eventually become monotonous.

See also
Jet Li filmography
List of Hong Kong films
Lone Wolf and Cub

References

External links

1994 films
1990s martial arts comedy films
1990s Cantonese-language films
Films directed by Corey Yuen
Films directed by Wong Jing
Films set in the Qing dynasty
Hong Kong martial arts comedy films
Kung fu films
Wushu films
1990s Hong Kong films